Jet Chang (born December 27, 1988) is a Taiwanese professional basketball player. A former player for the BYU–Hawaii Seasiders in Hawaii, United States, he led the Seasiders to a runner-up finish in the 2011 NCAA Division II tournament, in which he was named Most Outstanding Player. Chang also plays for the Chinese Taipei national basketball team and made his national team debut at the 2009 FIBA Asia Championship.

International career
Chang played primarily off the bench for the Chinese Taipei team at the 2009 Asian Championship as the youngest player on the team.  In his most extensive action of the tournament, he had game highs in points in Chinese Taipei's preliminary round victory over Uzbekistan and narrow eighth final loss against South Korea. 

In 2012, After going undrafted in the 2012 NBA Draft, Chang played for the Minnesota Timberwolves summer league team, but did not make the opening day NBA roster.

References

External links
 Jet Chang at BYU–Hawaii basketball site

1988 births
BYU–Hawaii Seasiders men's basketball players
Terrafirma Dyip players
Living people
Philippine Basketball Association imports
Sichuan Blue Whales players
Small forwards
People from Yilan County, Taiwan
Taiwanese men's basketball players
Taiwanese expatriate basketball people in the United States
Taiwanese expatriate basketball people in China
Sportspeople from Taipei
Taiwanese expatriate basketball people in the Philippines
Formosa Dreamers players
Fubon Braves players
Taipei Fubon Braves players
Chinese Taipei men's national basketball team players
Super Basketball League players
ASEAN Basketball League players
P. League+ players